Madurai Tamil Nāganār (Tamil: மதுரைத் தமிழ்நாகனார்) was a poet of the Sangam period to whom verse 29 of the Tiruvalluva Maalai.

Biography
Madurai Tamil Nāganār was a poet belonging to the late Sangam period that corresponds between 1st century BCE and 2nd century CE. He hailed from Madurai.

View on Valluvar and the Kural
Madurai Tamil Nāganār has authored verse 29 of the Tiruvalluva Maalai. He opines about Valluvar and the Kural text thus:

See also

 Sangam literature
 List of Sangam poets
 Tiruvalluva Maalai

Citations

References

 
 

Tamil philosophy
Tamil poets
Sangam poets
Tiruvalluva Maalai contributors